The flag of Overijssel is the official flag of the province of Overijssel. The flag consists of two red and yellow stripes along with a blue wave in the middle. It was adopted on 21 July 1948. The yellow and red stripes on the flag are supposed to represent the historical link with the province of Holland. The three colours are, namely, the colours of the coat of arms of Overijssel (a red lion in a golden field charged with a blue fesse wavy). In the centre of the flag, the wavy blue line represents the river IJssel, after which the province is named.

References 

Flag
Flags of the Netherlands
Flags introduced in 1948